The Phillip Schoppert House is a historic house in Eutaw, Alabama.  The two-story wood-frame house was built c. 1856.  It is an I-house with rear shed rooms and a hipped roof.  A two-tiered pedimented portico fronts the central three bays of the five-bay main facade.  It was added to the National Register of Historic Places as part of the Antebellum Homes in Eutaw Thematic Resource on April 2, 1982.

References

National Register of Historic Places in Greene County, Alabama
Houses on the National Register of Historic Places in Alabama
Houses in Greene County, Alabama
Houses completed in 1856
I-houses in Alabama